Fluorine is a chemical element with the symbol F and atomic number 9. It is the lightest halogen and exists at standard conditions as a highly toxic, pale yellow diatomic gas. As the most electronegative reactive element, it is extremely reactive, as it reacts with all other elements except for the light inert gases.

Among the elements, fluorine ranks 24th in universal abundance and 13th in terrestrial abundance. Fluorite, the primary mineral source of fluorine which gave the element its name, was first described in 1529; as it was added to metal ores to lower their melting points for smelting, the Latin verb  meaning 'flow' gave the mineral its name. Proposed as an element in 1810, fluorine proved difficult and dangerous to separate from its compounds, and several early experimenters died or sustained injuries from their attempts. Only in 1886 did French chemist Henri Moissan isolate elemental fluorine using low-temperature electrolysis, a process still employed for modern production. Industrial production of fluorine gas for uranium enrichment, its largest application, began during the Manhattan Project in World War II.

Owing to the expense of refining pure fluorine, most commercial applications use fluorine compounds, with about half of mined fluorite used in steelmaking. The rest of the fluorite is converted into corrosive hydrogen fluoride en route to various organic fluorides, or into cryolite, which plays a key role in aluminium refining. Molecules containing a carbon–fluorine bond often have very high chemical and thermal stability; their major uses are as refrigerants, electrical insulation and cookware, and PTFE (Teflon). Pharmaceuticals such as atorvastatin and fluoxetine contain C−F bonds. The fluoride ion from dissolved fluoride salts inhibits dental cavities, and so finds use in toothpaste and water fluoridation. Global fluorochemical sales amount to more than US$69 billion a year.

Fluorocarbon gases are generally greenhouse gases with global-warming potentials 100 to 23,500 times that of carbon dioxide, and SF6 has the highest global warming potential of any known substance. Organofluorine compounds often persist in the environment due to the strength of the carbon–fluorine bond. Fluorine has no known metabolic role in mammals; a few plants and sea sponges synthesize organofluorine poisons (most often monofluoroacetates) that help deter predation.

Characteristics

Electron configuration
Fluorine atoms have nine electrons, one fewer than neon, and electron configuration 1s22s22p5: two electrons in a filled inner shell and seven in an outer shell requiring one more to be filled. The outer electrons are ineffective at nuclear shielding, and experience a high effective nuclear charge of 9 − 2 = 7; this affects the atom's physical properties.

Fluorine's first ionization energy is third-highest among all elements, behind helium and neon, which complicates the removal of electrons from neutral fluorine atoms. It also has a high electron affinity, second only to chlorine, and tends to capture an electron to become isoelectronic with the noble gas neon; it has the highest electronegativity of any reactive element. Fluorine atoms have a small covalent radius of around 60 picometers, similar to those of its period neighbors oxygen and neon.

Reactivity

Conversely, bonds to other atoms are very strong because of fluorine's high electronegativity. Unreactive substances like powdered steel, glass fragments, and asbestos fibers react quickly with cold fluorine gas; wood and water spontaneously combust under a fluorine jet.

Reactions of elemental fluorine with metals require varying conditions. Alkali metals cause explosions and alkaline earth metals display vigorous activity in bulk; to prevent passivation from the formation of metal fluoride layers, most other metals such as aluminium and iron must be powdered, and noble metals require pure fluorine gas at 300–450 °C (575–850 °F). Some solid nonmetals (sulfur, phosphorus) react vigorously in liquid fluorine. Hydrogen sulfide and sulfur dioxide combine readily with fluorine, the latter sometimes explosively; sulfuric acid exhibits much less activity, requiring elevated temperatures.

Hydrogen, like some of the alkali metals, reacts explosively with fluorine. Carbon, as lamp black, reacts at room temperature to yield tetrafluoromethane. Graphite combines with fluorine above 400 °C (750 °F) to produce non-stoichiometric carbon monofluoride; higher temperatures generate gaseous fluorocarbons, sometimes with explosions. Carbon dioxide and carbon monoxide react at or just above room temperature, whereas paraffins and other organic chemicals generate strong reactions: even completely substituted haloalkanes such as carbon tetrachloride, normally incombustible, may explode. Although nitrogen trifluoride is stable, nitrogen requires an electric discharge at elevated temperatures for reaction with fluorine to occur, due to the very strong triple bond in elemental nitrogen; ammonia may react explosively. Oxygen does not combine with fluorine under ambient conditions, but can be made to react using electric discharge at low temperatures and pressures; the products tend to disintegrate into their constituent elements when heated. Heavier halogens react readily with fluorine as does the noble gas radon; of the other noble gases, only xenon and krypton react, and only under special conditions. Argon does not react with fluorine gas; however, it does form a compound with fluorine, argon fluorohydride.

Phases

At room temperature, fluorine is a gas of diatomic molecules, pale yellow when pure (sometimes described as yellow-green). It has a characteristic halogen-like pungent and biting odor detectable at 20 ppb. Fluorine condenses into a bright yellow liquid at −188 °C (−306 °F), a transition temperature similar to those of oxygen and nitrogen.

Fluorine has two solid forms, α- and β-fluorine. The latter crystallizes at −220 °C (−364 °F) and is transparent and soft, with the same disordered cubic structure of freshly crystallized solid oxygen, unlike the orthorhombic systems of other solid halogens. Further cooling to −228 °C (−378 °F) induces a phase transition into opaque and hard α-fluorine, which has a monoclinic structure with dense, angled layers of molecules. The transition from β- to α-fluorine is more exothermic than the condensation of fluorine, and can be violent.

Isotopes

Only one isotope of fluorine occurs naturally in abundance, the stable isotope . It has a high magnetogyric ratio and exceptional sensitivity to magnetic fields; because it is also the only stable isotope, it is used in magnetic resonance imaging. Other radioisotopes have half-lives less than 70 seconds; most decay in less than half a second. The isotopes  and  undergo β+ decay and electron capture, lighter isotopes decay by proton emission, and those heavier than  undergo β− decay (the heaviest ones with delayed neutron emission).

Occurrence

Universe

Among the lighter elements, fluorine's abundance value of 400 ppb (parts per billion) – 24th among elements in the universe – is exceptionally low: other elements from carbon to magnesium are twenty or more times as common. This is because stellar nucleosynthesis processes bypass fluorine, and any fluorine atoms otherwise created have high nuclear cross sections, allowing collisions with hydrogen or helium to generate oxygen or neon respectively.

Beyond this transient existence, three explanations have been proposed for the presence of fluorine:
 during type II supernovae, bombardment of neon atoms by neutrinos could transmute them to fluorine;
 the solar wind of Wolf–Rayet stars could blow fluorine away from any hydrogen or helium atoms; or
 fluorine is borne out on convection currents arising from fusion in asymptotic giant branch stars.

Earth

Fluorine is the thirteenth most common element in Earth's crust at 600–700 ppm (parts per million) by mass. Though believed not to occur naturally, elemental fluorine has been shown to be present as an occlusion in antozonite, a variant of fluorite. Most fluorine exists as fluoride-containing minerals. Fluorite, fluorapatite and cryolite are the most industrially significant. Fluorite, also known as fluorspar, abundant worldwide, is the main source of fluoride, and hence fluorine. China and Mexico are the major suppliers. Fluorapatite (Ca5(PO4)3F), which contains most of the world's fluoride, is an inadvertent source of fluoride as a byproduct of fertilizer production. Cryolite, used in the production of aluminium, is the most fluorine-rich mineral. Economically viable natural sources of cryolite have been exhausted, and most is now synthesised commercially.

Other minerals such as topaz contain fluorine. Fluorides, unlike other halides, are insoluble and do not occur in commercially favorable concentrations in saline waters. Trace quantities of organofluorines of uncertain origin have been detected in volcanic eruptions and geothermal springs. The existence of gaseous fluorine in crystals, suggested by the smell of crushed antozonite, is contentious; a 2012 study reported the presence of 0.04%  by weight in antozonite, attributing these inclusions to radiation from the presence of tiny amounts of uranium.

History

Early discoveries

In 1529, Georgius Agricola described fluorite as an additive used to lower the melting point of metals during smelting. He penned the Latin word fluorēs (fluor, flow) for fluorite rocks. The name later evolved into fluorspar (still commonly used) and then fluorite. The composition of fluorite was later determined to be calcium difluoride.

Hydrofluoric acid was used in glass etching from 1720 onward. Andreas Sigismund Marggraf first characterized it in 1764 when he heated fluorite with sulfuric acid, and the resulting solution corroded its glass container. Swedish chemist Carl Wilhelm Scheele repeated the experiment in 1771, and named the acidic product fluss-spats-syran (fluorspar acid). In 1810, the French physicist André-Marie Ampère suggested that hydrogen and an element analogous to chlorine constituted hydrofluoric acid. He also proposed in a letter to Sir Humphry Davy dated August 26, 1812 that this then-unknown substance may be named fluorine from fluoric acid and the -ine suffix of other halogens. This word, often with modifications, is used in most European languages; however, Greek, Russian, and some others, following Ampère's later suggestion, use the name ftor or derivatives, from the Greek φθόριος (phthorios, destructive). The New Latin name fluorum gave the element its current symbol F; Fl was used in early papers.

Isolation

Initial studies on fluorine were so dangerous that several 19th-century experimenters were deemed "fluorine martyrs" after misfortunes with hydrofluoric acid. Isolation of elemental fluorine was hindered by the extreme corrosiveness of both elemental fluorine itself and hydrogen fluoride, as well as the lack of a simple and suitable electrolyte. Edmond Frémy postulated that electrolysis of pure hydrogen fluoride to generate fluorine was feasible and devised a method to produce anhydrous samples from acidified potassium bifluoride; instead, he discovered that the resulting (dry) hydrogen fluoride did not conduct electricity. Frémy's former student Henri Moissan persevered, and after much trial and error found that a mixture of potassium bifluoride and dry hydrogen fluoride was a conductor, enabling electrolysis. To prevent rapid corrosion of the platinum in his electrochemical cells, he cooled the reaction to extremely low temperatures in a special bath and forged cells from a more resistant mixture of platinum and iridium, and used fluorite stoppers. In 1886, after 74 years of effort by many chemists, Moissan isolated elemental fluorine.

In 1906, two months before his death, Moissan received the Nobel Prize in Chemistry, with the following citation:

Later uses

The Frigidaire division of General Motors (GM) experimented with chlorofluorocarbon refrigerants in the late 1920s, and Kinetic Chemicals was formed as a joint venture between GM and DuPont in 1930 hoping to market Freon-12 as one such refrigerant. It replaced earlier and more toxic compounds, increased demand for kitchen refrigerators, and became profitable; by 1949 DuPont had bought out Kinetic and marketed several other Freon compounds. Polytetrafluoroethylene (Teflon) was serendipitously discovered in 1938 by Roy J. Plunkett while working on refrigerants at Kinetic, and its superlative chemical and thermal resistance lent it to accelerated commercialization and mass production by 1941.

Large-scale production of elemental fluorine began during World War II. Germany used high-temperature electrolysis to make tons of the planned incendiary chlorine trifluoride and the Manhattan Project used huge quantities to produce uranium hexafluoride for uranium enrichment. Since  is as corrosive as fluorine, gaseous diffusion plants required special materials: nickel for membranes, fluoropolymers for seals, and liquid fluorocarbons as coolants and lubricants. This burgeoning nuclear industry later drove post-war fluorochemical development.

Compounds

Fluorine has a rich chemistry, encompassing organic and inorganic domains. It combines with metals, nonmetals, metalloids, and most noble gases, and almost exclusively assumes an oxidation state of −1. Fluorine's high electron affinity results in a preference for ionic bonding; when it forms covalent bonds, these are polar, and almost always single.

Metals

Alkali metals form ionic and highly soluble monofluorides; these have the cubic arrangement of sodium chloride and analogous chlorides. Alkaline earth difluorides possess strong ionic bonds but are insoluble in water, with the exception of beryllium difluoride, which also exhibits some covalent character and has a quartz-like structure. Rare earth elements and many other metals form mostly ionic trifluorides.

Covalent bonding first comes to prominence in the tetrafluorides: those of zirconium, hafnium and several actinides are ionic with high melting points, while those of titanium, vanadium, and niobium are polymeric, melting or decomposing at no more than 350 °C (660 °F). Pentafluorides continue this trend with their linear polymers and oligomeric complexes. Rhenium heptafluoride, the only characterized metal heptafluoride, is a low-melting molecular solid with pentagonal bipyramidal molecular geometry. Metal fluorides with more fluorine atoms are particularly reactive.

Hydrogen

Hydrogen and fluorine combine to yield hydrogen fluoride, in which discrete molecules form clusters by hydrogen bonding, resembling water more than hydrogen chloride. It boils at a much higher temperature than heavier hydrogen halides and unlike them is miscible with water. Hydrogen fluoride readily hydrates on contact with water to form aqueous hydrogen fluoride, also known as hydrofluoric acid. Unlike the other hydrohalic acids, which are strong, hydrofluoric acid is a weak acid at low concentrations. However, it can attack glass, something the other acids cannot do.

Other reactive nonmetals

Binary fluorides of metalloids and p-block nonmetals are generally covalent and volatile, with varying reactivities. Period 3 and heavier nonmetals can form hypervalent fluorides.

Boron trifluoride is planar and possesses an incomplete octet. It functions as a Lewis acid and combines with Lewis bases like ammonia to form adducts. Carbon tetrafluoride is tetrahedral and inert; its group analogues, silicon and germanium tetrafluoride, are also tetrahedral but behave as Lewis acids. The pnictogens form trifluorides that increase in reactivity and basicity with higher molecular weight, although nitrogen trifluoride resists hydrolysis and is not basic. The pentafluorides of phosphorus, arsenic, and antimony are more reactive than their respective trifluorides, with antimony pentafluoride the strongest neutral Lewis acid known.

Chalcogens have diverse fluorides: unstable difluorides have been reported for oxygen (the only known compound with oxygen in an oxidation state of +2), sulfur, and selenium; tetrafluorides and hexafluorides exist for sulfur, selenium, and tellurium. The latter are stabilized by more fluorine atoms and lighter central atoms, so sulfur hexafluoride is especially inert. Chlorine, bromine, and iodine can each form mono-, tri-, and pentafluorides, but only iodine heptafluoride has been characterized among possible interhalogen heptafluorides. Many of them are powerful sources of fluorine atoms, and industrial applications using chlorine trifluoride require precautions similar to those using fluorine.

Noble gases

Noble gases, having complete electron shells, defied reaction with other elements until 1962 when Neil Bartlett reported synthesis of xenon hexafluoroplatinate; xenon difluoride, tetrafluoride, hexafluoride, and multiple oxyfluorides have been isolated since then. Among other noble gases, krypton forms a difluoride, and radon and fluorine generate a solid suspected to be radon difluoride. Binary fluorides of lighter noble gases are exceptionally unstable: argon and hydrogen fluoride combine under extreme conditions to give argon fluorohydride. Helium and neon have no long-lived fluorides, and no neon fluoride has ever been observed; helium fluorohydride has been detected for milliseconds at high pressures and low temperatures.

Organic compounds

The carbon–fluorine bond is organic chemistry's strongest, and gives stability to organofluorines. It is almost non-existent in nature, but is used in artificial compounds. Research in this area is usually driven by commercial applications; the compounds involved are diverse and reflect the complexity inherent in organic chemistry.

Discrete molecules

The substitution of hydrogen atoms in an alkane by progressively more fluorine atoms gradually alters several properties: melting and boiling points are lowered, density increases, solubility in hydrocarbons decreases and overall stability increases. Perfluorocarbons, in which all hydrogen atoms are substituted, are insoluble in most organic solvents, reacting at ambient conditions only with sodium in liquid ammonia.

The term perfluorinated compound is used for what would otherwise be a perfluorocarbon if not for the presence of a functional group, often a carboxylic acid. These compounds share many properties with perfluorocarbons such as stability and hydrophobicity, while the functional group augments their reactivity, enabling them to adhere to surfaces or act as surfactants; Fluorosurfactants, in particular, can lower the surface tension of water more than their hydrocarbon-based analogues. Fluorotelomers, which have some unfluorinated carbon atoms near the functional group, are also regarded as perfluorinated.

Polymers
Polymers exhibit the same stability increases afforded by fluorine substitution (for hydrogen) in discrete molecules; their melting points generally increase too. Polytetrafluoroethylene (PTFE), the simplest fluoropolymer and perfluoro analogue of polyethylene with structural unit ––, demonstrates this change as expected, but its very high melting point makes it difficult to mold. Various PTFE derivatives are less temperature-tolerant but easier to mold: fluorinated ethylene propylene replaces some fluorine atoms with trifluoromethyl groups, perfluoroalkoxy alkanes do the same with trifluoromethoxy groups, and Nafion contains perfluoroether side chains capped with sulfonic acid groups. Other fluoropolymers retain some hydrogen atoms; polyvinylidene fluoride has half the fluorine atoms of PTFE and polyvinyl fluoride has a quarter, but both behave much like perfluorinated polymers.

Production
Elemental fluorine and virtually all fluorine compounds are produced from hydrogen fluoride or its aqueous solutions, hydrofluoric acid. Hydrogen fluoride is produced in kilns by the endothermic reaction of fluorite (CaF2) with sulfuric acid:

CaF2  +  H2SO4  →  2 HF(g)  +  CaSO4

The gaseous HF can then be absorbed in water or liquefied.

About 20% of manufactured HF is a byproduct of fertilizer production, which produces hexafluorosilicic acid (H2SiF6), which can be degraded to release HF thermally and by hydrolysis:
H2SiF6  →  2 HF  +  SiF4
SiF4  +  2 H2O   →  4 HF  +  SiO2

Industrial routes to F2

Moissan's method is used to produce industrial quantities of fluorine, via the electrolysis of a potassium fluoride/hydrogen fluoride mixture: hydrogen and fluoride ions are reduced and oxidized at a steel container cathode and a carbon block anode, under 8–12 volts, to generate hydrogen and fluorine gas respectively. KF, which acts to provide electrical conductivity, is essential since pure HF cannot be electrolyzed because it is virtually non-conductive. Fluorine can be stored in steel cylinders that have passivated interiors, at temperatures below ; otherwise nickel can be used. Regulator valves and pipework are made of nickel, the latter possibly using Monel instead. Frequent passivation, along with the strict exclusion of water and greases, must be undertaken. In the laboratory, glassware may carry fluorine gas under low pressure and anhydrous conditions; some sources instead recommend nickel-Monel-PTFE systems.

Laboratory routes
While preparing for a 1986 conference to celebrate the centennial of Moissan's achievement, Karl O. Christe reasoned that chemical fluorine generation should be feasible since some metal fluoride anions have no stable neutral counterparts; their acidification potentially triggers oxidation instead. He devised a method which evolves fluorine at high yield and atmospheric pressure:

2 KMnO4 + 2 KF + 10 HF + 3 H2O2 → 2 K2MnF6 + 8 H2O + 3 O2↑
2 K2MnF6 + 4 SbF5 → 4 KSbF6 + 2 MnF3 + F2↑

Christe later commented that the reactants "had been known for more than 100 years and even Moissan could have come up with this scheme." As late as 2008, some references still asserted that fluorine was too reactive for any chemical isolation.

Industrial applications

Fluorite mining, which supplies most global fluorine, peaked in 1989 when 5.6 million metric tons of ore were extracted. Chlorofluorocarbon restrictions lowered this to 3.6 million tons in 1994; production has since been increasing. Around 4.5 million tons of ore and revenue of US$550 million were generated in 2003; later reports estimated 2011 global fluorochemical sales at $15 billion and predicted 2016–18 production figures of 3.5 to 5.9 million tons, and revenue of at least $20 billion. Froth flotation separates mined fluorite into two main metallurgical grades of equal proportion: 60–85% pure metspar is almost all used in iron smelting whereas 97%+ pure acidspar is mainly converted to the key industrial intermediate hydrogen fluoride.

At least 17,000 metric tons of fluorine are produced each year. It costs only $5–8 per kilogram as uranium or sulfur hexafluoride, but many times more as an element because of handling challenges. Most processes using free fluorine in large amounts employ in situ generation under vertical integration.

Fluorine is used to fluorinate uranium tetrafluoride, itself formed from uranium dioxide and hydrofluoric acid. About 6,000 metric tons per year go into producing the inert dielectric  for high-voltage transformers and circuit breakers, eliminating the need for hazardous polychlorinated biphenyls associated with  devices. Several fluorine compounds are used in electronics: rhenium and tungsten hexafluoride in chemical vapor deposition, tetrafluoromethane in plasma etching and nitrogen trifluoride in cleaning equipment. Fluorinated pharmaceuticals use sulfur tetrafluoride instead.

Inorganic fluorides

As with other iron alloys, around 3 kg (6.5 lb) metspar is added to each metric ton of steel; the fluoride ions lower its melting point and viscosity. Alongside its role as an additive in materials like enamels and welding rod coats, most acidspar is reacted with sulfuric acid to form hydrofluoric acid, which is used in steel pickling, glass etching and alkane cracking. One-third of HF goes into synthesizing cryolite and aluminium trifluoride, both fluxes in the Hall–Héroult process for aluminium extraction; replenishment is necessitated by their occasional reactions with the smelting apparatus. Each metric ton of aluminium requires about 23 kg (51 lb) of flux. Fluorosilicates consume the second largest portion, with sodium fluorosilicate used in water fluoridation and laundry effluent treatment, and as an intermediate en route to cryolite and silicon tetrafluoride. Other important inorganic fluorides include those of cobalt, nickel, and ammonium.

Organic fluorides
Organofluorides consume over 20% of mined fluorite and over 40% of hydrofluoric acid, with refrigerant gases dominating and fluoropolymers increasing their market share. Surfactants are a minor application but generate over $1 billion in annual revenue. Due to the danger from direct hydrocarbon–fluorine reactions above −150 °C (−240 °F), industrial fluorocarbon production is indirect, mostly through halogen exchange reactions such as Swarts fluorination, in which chlorocarbon chlorines are substituted for fluorines by hydrogen fluoride under catalysts. Electrochemical fluorination subjects hydrocarbons to electrolysis in hydrogen fluoride, and the Fowler process treats them with solid fluorine carriers like cobalt trifluoride.

Refrigerant gases

Halogenated refrigerants, termed Freons in informal contexts, are identified by R-numbers that denote the amount of fluorine, chlorine, carbon, and hydrogen present. Chlorofluorocarbons (CFCs) like R-11, R-12, and R-114 once dominated organofluorines, peaking in production in the 1980s. Used for air conditioning systems, propellants and solvents, their production was below one-tenth of this peak by the early 2000s, after widespread international prohibition. Hydrochlorofluorocarbons (HCFCs) and hydrofluorocarbons (HFCs) were designed as replacements; their synthesis consumes more than 90% of the fluorine in the organic industry. Important HCFCs include R-22, chlorodifluoromethane, and R-141b. The main HFC is R-134a with a new type of molecule HFO-1234yf, a Hydrofluoroolefin (HFO) coming to prominence owing to its global warming potential of less than 1% that of HFC-134a.

Polymers

About 180,000 metric tons of fluoropolymers were produced in 2006 and 2007, generating over $3.5 billion revenue per year. The global market was estimated at just under $6 billion in 2011 and was predicted to grow by 6.5% per year up to 2016. Fluoropolymers can only be formed by polymerizing free radicals.

Polytetrafluoroethylene (PTFE), sometimes called by its DuPont name Teflon, represents 60–80% by mass of the world's fluoropolymer production. The largest application is in electrical insulation since PTFE is an excellent dielectric. It is also used in the chemical industry where corrosion resistance is needed, in coating pipes, tubing, and gaskets. Another major use is in PFTE-coated fiberglass cloth for stadium roofs. The major consumer application is for non-stick cookware. Jerked PTFE film becomes expanded PTFE (ePTFE), a fine-pored membrane sometimes referred to by the brand name Gore-Tex and used for rainwear, protective apparel, and filters; ePTFE fibers may be made into seals and dust filters. Other fluoropolymers, including fluorinated ethylene propylene, mimic PTFE's properties and can substitute for it; they are more moldable, but also more costly and have lower thermal stability. Films from two different fluoropolymers replace glass in solar cells.

The chemically resistant (but expensive) fluorinated ionomers are used as electrochemical cell membranes, of which the first and most prominent example is Nafion. Developed in the 1960s, it was initially deployed as fuel cell material in spacecraft and then replaced mercury-based chloralkali process cells. Recently, the fuel cell application has reemerged with efforts to install proton exchange membrane fuel cells into automobiles. Fluoroelastomers such as Viton are crosslinked fluoropolymer mixtures mainly used in O-rings; perfluorobutane (C4F10) is used as a fire-extinguishing agent.

Surfactants

Fluorosurfactants are small organofluorine molecules used for repelling water and stains. Although expensive (comparable to pharmaceuticals at $200–2000 per kilogram), they yielded over $1 billion in annual revenues by 2006; Scotchgard alone generated over $300 million in 2000. Fluorosurfactants are a minority in the overall surfactant market, most of which is taken up by much cheaper hydrocarbon-based products. Applications in paints are burdened by compounding costs; this use was valued at only $100 million in 2006.

Agrichemicals
About 30% of agrichemicals contain fluorine, most of them herbicides and fungicides with a few crop regulators. Fluorine substitution, usually of a single atom or at most a trifluoromethyl group, is a robust modification with effects analogous to fluorinated pharmaceuticals: increased biological stay time, membrane crossing, and altering of molecular recognition. Trifluralin is a prominent example, with large-scale use in the U.S. as a weedkiller, but it is a suspected carcinogen and has been banned in many European countries. Sodium monofluoroacetate (1080) is a mammalian poison in which two acetic acid hydrogens are replaced with fluorine and sodium; it disrupts cell metabolism by replacing acetate in the citric acid cycle. First synthesized in the late 19th century, it was recognized as an insecticide in the early 20th, and was later deployed in its current use. New Zealand, the largest consumer of 1080, uses it to protect kiwis from the invasive Australian common brushtail possum. Europe and the U.S. have banned 1080.

Medicinal applications

Dental care

Population studies from the mid-20th century onwards show topical fluoride reduces dental caries. This was first attributed to the conversion of tooth enamel hydroxyapatite into the more durable fluorapatite, but studies on pre-fluoridated teeth refuted this hypothesis, and current theories involve fluoride aiding enamel growth in small caries. After studies of children in areas where fluoride was naturally present in drinking water, controlled public water supply fluoridation to fight tooth decay began in the 1940s and is now applied to water supplying 6 percent of the global population, including two-thirds of Americans. Reviews of the scholarly literature in 2000 and 2007 associated water fluoridation with a significant reduction of tooth decay in children. Despite such endorsements and evidence of no adverse effects other than mostly benign dental fluorosis, opposition still exists on ethical and safety grounds. The benefits of fluoridation have lessened, possibly due to other fluoride sources, but are still measurable in low-income groups. Sodium monofluorophosphate and sometimes sodium or tin(II) fluoride are often found in fluoride toothpastes, first introduced in the U.S. in 1955 and now ubiquitous in developed countries, alongside fluoridated mouthwashes, gels, foams, and varnishes.

Pharmaceuticals

Twenty percent of modern pharmaceuticals contain fluorine. One of these, the cholesterol-reducer atorvastatin (Lipitor), made more revenue than any other drug until it became generic in 2011. The combination asthma prescription Seretide, a top-ten revenue drug in the mid-2000s, contains two active ingredients, one of which – fluticasone – is fluorinated. Many drugs are fluorinated to delay inactivation and lengthen dosage periods because the carbon–fluorine bond is very stable. Fluorination also increases lipophilicity because the bond is more hydrophobic than the carbon–hydrogen bond, and this often helps in cell membrane penetration and hence bioavailability.

Tricyclics and other pre-1980s antidepressants had several side effects due to their non-selective interference with neurotransmitters other than the serotonin target; the fluorinated fluoxetine was selective and one of the first to avoid this problem. Many current antidepressants receive this same treatment, including the selective serotonin reuptake inhibitors: citalopram, its isomer escitalopram, and fluvoxamine and paroxetine. Quinolones are artificial broad-spectrum antibiotics that are often fluorinated to enhance their effects. These include ciprofloxacin and levofloxacin. Fluorine also finds use in steroids: fludrocortisone is a blood pressure-raising mineralocorticoid, and triamcinolone and dexamethasone are strong glucocorticoids. The majority of inhaled anesthetics are heavily fluorinated; the prototype halothane is much more inert and potent than its contemporaries. Later compounds such as the fluorinated ethers sevoflurane and desflurane are better than halothane and are almost insoluble in blood, allowing faster waking times.

PET scanning

Fluorine-18 is often found in radioactive tracers for positron emission tomography, as its half-life of almost two hours is long enough to allow for its transport from production facilities to imaging centers. The most common tracer is fluorodeoxyglucose which, after intravenous injection, is taken up by glucose-requiring tissues such as the brain and most malignant tumors; computer-assisted tomography can then be used for detailed imaging.

Oxygen carriers

Liquid fluorocarbons can hold large volumes of oxygen or carbon dioxide, more so than blood, and have attracted attention for their possible uses in artificial blood and in liquid breathing. Because fluorocarbons do not normally mix with water, they must be mixed into emulsions (small droplets of perfluorocarbon suspended in water) to be used as blood. One such product, Oxycyte, has been through initial clinical trials. These substances can aid endurance athletes and are banned from sports; one cyclist's near death in 1998 prompted an investigation into their abuse. Applications of pure perfluorocarbon liquid breathing (which uses pure perfluorocarbon liquid, not a water emulsion) include assisting burn victims and premature babies with deficient lungs. Partial and complete lung filling have been considered, though only the former has had any significant tests in humans. An Alliance Pharmaceuticals effort reached clinical trials but was abandoned because the results were not better than normal therapies.

Biological role

Fluorine is not essential for humans and other mammals, but small amounts are known to be beneficial for the strengthening of dental enamel (where the formation of fluorapatite makes the enamel more resistant to attack, from acids produced by bacterial fermentation of sugars). Small amounts of fluorine may be beneficial for bone strength, but the latter has not been definitively established. Both the WHO and the Institute of Medicine of the US National Academies publish recommended daily allowance (RDA) and upper tolerated intake of fluorine, which varies with age and gender.

Natural organofluorines have been found in microorganisms and plants but not animals. The most common is fluoroacetate, which is used as a defense against herbivores by at least 40 plants in Africa, Australia and Brazil. Other examples include terminally fluorinated fatty acids, fluoroacetone, and 2-fluorocitrate. An enzyme that binds fluorine to carbon – adenosyl-fluoride synthase – was discovered in bacteria in 2002.

Toxicity

Elemental fluorine is highly toxic to living organisms. Its effects in humans start at concentrations lower than hydrogen cyanide's 50 ppm and are similar to those of chlorine: significant irritation of the eyes and respiratory system as well as liver and kidney damage occur above 25 ppm, which is the immediately dangerous to life and health value for fluorine. The eyes and nose are seriously damaged at 100 ppm, and inhalation of 1,000 ppm fluorine will cause death in minutes, compared to 270 ppm for hydrogen cyanide.

Hydrofluoric acid

Hydrofluoric acid is the weakest of the hydrohalic acids, having a pKa of 3.2 at 25 °C. It is a volatile liquid due to the presence of hydrogen bonding (while the other hydrohalic acids are gases). It is able to attack glass, concrete, metals, and organic matter.

Hydrofluoric acid is a contact poison with greater hazards than many strong acids like sulfuric acid even though it is weak: it remains neutral in aqueous solution and thus penetrates tissue faster, whether through inhalation, ingestion or the skin, and at least nine U.S. workers died in such accidents from 1984 to 1994. It reacts with calcium and magnesium in the blood leading to hypocalcemia and possible death through cardiac arrhythmia. Insoluble calcium fluoride formation triggers strong pain and burns larger than 160 cm2 (25 in2) can cause serious systemic toxicity.

Exposure may not be evident for eight hours for 50% HF, rising to 24 hours for lower concentrations, and a burn may initially be painless as hydrogen fluoride affects nerve function. If skin has been exposed to HF, damage can be reduced by rinsing it under a jet of water for 10–15 minutes and removing contaminated clothing. Calcium gluconate is often applied next, providing calcium ions to bind with fluoride; skin burns can be treated with 2.5% calcium gluconate gel or special rinsing solutions. Hydrofluoric acid absorption requires further medical treatment; calcium gluconate may be injected or administered intravenously. Using calcium chloride – a common laboratory reagent – in lieu of calcium gluconate is contraindicated, and may lead to severe complications. Excision or amputation of affected parts may be required.

Fluoride ion

Soluble fluorides are moderately toxic: 5–10 g sodium fluoride, or 32–64 mg fluoride ions per kilogram of body mass, represents a lethal dose for adults. One-fifth of the lethal dose can cause adverse health effects, and chronic excess consumption may lead to skeletal fluorosis, which affects millions in Asia and Africa. Ingested fluoride forms hydrofluoric acid in the stomach which is easily absorbed by the intestines, where it crosses cell membranes, binds with calcium and interferes with various enzymes, before urinary excretion. Exposure limits are determined by urine testing of the body's ability to clear fluoride ions.

Historically, most cases of fluoride poisoning have been caused by accidental ingestion of insecticides containing inorganic fluorides. Most current calls to poison control centers for possible fluoride poisoning come from the ingestion of fluoride-containing toothpaste. Malfunctioning water fluoridation equipment is another cause: one incident in Alaska affected almost 300 people and killed one person. Dangers from toothpaste are aggravated for small children, and the Centers for Disease Control and Prevention recommends supervising children below six brushing their teeth so that they do not swallow toothpaste. One regional study examined a year of pre-teen fluoride poisoning reports totaling 87 cases, including one death from ingesting insecticide. Most had no symptoms, but about 30% had stomach pains. A larger study across the U.S. had similar findings: 80% of cases involved children under six, and there were few serious cases.

Environmental concerns

Atmosphere

The Montreal Protocol, signed in 1987, set strict regulations on chlorofluorocarbons (CFCs) and bromofluorocarbons due to their ozone damaging potential (ODP). The high stability which suited them to their original applications also meant that they were not decomposing until they reached higher altitudes, where liberated chlorine and bromine atoms attacked ozone molecules. Even with the ban, and early indications of its efficacy, predictions warned that several generations would pass before full recovery. With one-tenth the ODP of CFCs, hydrochlorofluorocarbons (HCFCs) are the current replacements, and are themselves scheduled for substitution by 2030–2040 by hydrofluorocarbons (HFCs) with no chlorine and zero ODP. In 2007 this date was brought forward to 2020 for developed countries; the Environmental Protection Agency had already prohibited one HCFC's production and capped those of two others in 2003. Fluorocarbon gases are generally greenhouse gases with global-warming potentials (GWPs) of about 100 to 10,000; sulfur hexafluoride has a value of around 20,000. An outlier is HFO-1234yf which is a new type of refrigerant called a Hydrofluoroolefin (HFO) and has attracted global demand due to its GWP of less than 1 compared to 1,430 for the current refrigerant standard HFC-134a.

Biopersistence

Organofluorines exhibit biopersistence due to the strength of the carbon–fluorine bond. Perfluoroalkyl acids (PFAAs), which are sparingly water-soluble owing to their acidic functional groups, are noted persistent organic pollutants; perfluorooctanesulfonic acid (PFOS) and perfluorooctanoic acid (PFOA) are most often researched. PFAAs have been found in trace quantities worldwide from polar bears to humans, with PFOS and PFOA known to reside in breast milk and the blood of newborn babies. A 2013 review showed a slight correlation between groundwater and soil PFAA levels and human activity; there was no clear pattern of one chemical dominating, and higher amounts of PFOS were correlated to higher amounts of PFOA. In the body, PFAAs bind to proteins such as serum albumin; they tend to concentrate within humans in the liver and blood before excretion through the kidneys. Dwell time in the body varies greatly by species, with half-lives of days in rodents, and years in humans. High doses of PFOS and PFOA cause cancer and death in newborn rodents but human studies have not established an effect at current exposure levels.

See also

 Argon fluoride laser
 Electrophilic fluorination
 Fluoride selective electrode, which measures fluoride concentration
 Fluorine absorption dating
 Fluorous chemistry, a process used to separate reagents from organic solvents
 Krypton fluoride laser
 Radical fluorination

Notes

Sources

Citations

Indexed references

.

<

External links

 
Chemical elements
Halogens
Reactive nonmetals
Diatomic nonmetals
Fluorinating agents
Oxidizing agents
Industrial gases
Gases with color